Robby Smith (born January 30, 1987) is an American Greco-Roman wrestler who competed at the 2016 Olympics.

He won a bronze medal at the 2015 Pan American Games in the Men's Greco-Roman 130 kg event.

Smith is a three-time competitor at the Wrestling World Championships with his best result being a pair of 5th-place finishes including in 2015.  This result secured the U.S. a place in the 2016 Olympics in his weight class.  Smith won the 2016 U.S. Olympic Trials in the same division and represented the U.S. in Rio. He was defeated in the Round of 16 by Sabah Shariati.

He wrestles for the New York Athletic Club.

Smith attended Northern Michigan University.

References

External links
 

1987 births
Living people
American male sport wrestlers
Wrestlers at the 2015 Pan American Games
Wrestlers at the 2016 Summer Olympics
Olympic wrestlers of the United States
Pan American Games bronze medalists for the United States
Pan American Games medalists in wrestling
Medalists at the 2015 Pan American Games
20th-century American people
21st-century American people